Clopimozide (R-29,764) is a typical antipsychotic drug of the diphenylbutylpiperidine class. It is very potent and has an extremely long duration of action, lasting at least one week with a single dose. It was developed by Janssen Pharmaceutica but was never marketed.

Synthesis
[53786-28-0] also used for: Domperidone, Halopemide & Axamozide.
[3312-04-7] is also used for: Amperozide, Fluspirilene, Pimozide, Penfluridol, Lidoflazine & R 1624.

The alkylation between 5-Chloro-1-(4-Piperidyl)-2-Benzimidazolinone [53786-28-0] (1) and 1,1'-(4-Chlorobutylidene)bis(4-fluorobenzene) [3312-04-7] (2) gives clopimozide (3).

See also 
 Typical antipsychotic
 Diphenylbutylpiperidine

References 

Benzimidazoles
Chloroarenes
1-(4,4-Bis(4-fluorophenyl)butyl)piperidines
Ureas
Typical antipsychotics